Juan Lazcano (born March 23, 1975) is a Mexican-born American professional boxer currently based in Sacramento, California. He fights at light welterweight and is a former World Boxing Foundation (WBF), NABF and IBA lightweight champion, as well as having challenged for the IBO light welterweight title.

Background
Lazcano was born in Ciudad Juárez and was moved to El Paso when two months old. There, he attended Jefferson High School, later finishing at Bowie High. At Jefferson High, he and classmate Daniel Puente, along with other young boxers, sparred together at Rocky's Gym where he was crowned the Golden Gloves. He now lives and fights out of Sacramento, California.

He and Lourdes were childhood sweethearts, but are now divorced. They have four children together. They became parents when Juan was only 17 years of age. Lazcano is engaged to Tammy Howard, a teacher in Phoenix, AZ. They have been together since 2018.

Amateur career
Lazcano had an extensive amateur career. He had in excess of 100 amateur fights from the age of 8 to 18 with 135 wins and 15 losses and won the Texas Golden Gloves titles and boxed in the US national championships at both junior and open class levels.

Professional career

Lazcano turned professional in July 1993 in Reseda, California on the undercard of a bill that included Shane Mosley and Mauro Gutierrez. On his debut he defeated Chris Crespin with a first round knockout.

Title Fight
Lazcano won twelve of his first thirteen with eight victories coming via knockout. Then, in December 1996, Lazcano fought his first title fight against Californian Daniel Lujan for the vacant WBF lightweight title. The first fight between the two was judge a draw and they again faced each other in a rematch three months later. This time Lazcano emerged victorious with fourth-round knockout.

Lazcano took on Ricky Hatton at the City Of Manchester Stadium on May 24, a bout that Lazcano lost via unanimous decision. Lazcano dished out and received punishment from Hatton from start to finish. At one point Lazcano had Hatton visibly hurt. A moment in which a quick timeout was called by the referee so Hatton's corner could tie his shoe.

References

External links
 

1975 births
People from Ciudad Juárez
Boxers from Chihuahua (state)
Living people
Mexican male boxers
Lightweight boxers
Boxers from Sacramento, California